Ulmus × hollandica 'Folia Rhomboidea' is one of a number of cultivars possibly arising from the crossing of the Wych Elm Ulmus glabra with a variety of Field Elm Ulmus minor. First mentioned by Morren in 1851 as U. campestris latifolia, foliis rhomboides.

Description
Reputed to resemble 'Pitteurs' but for the rhomboid shape of the leaf.

Cultivation
Once grown on the Pitteurs estate, Sint-Truiden, Belgium. No specimens are known to survive.

References

Dutch elm cultivar
Ulmus articles missing images
Ulmus
Missing elm cultivars